Pleather is an EP by the grunge band Toadies. It was released in 1993 on Grass Records.  The EP gained the attention of Interscope Records who signed the band and released their first full-length album (Rubberneck) in 1994.  Interscope re-released Pleather on June 17, 1997.

Track listing
"Mister Love" (Lewis) – 2:52
"Got A Heart" (Lewis) – 3:16
"Ruth" (Lewis/Reznicek/Sauerwein) – 3:05
"Happy Face" (Lewis/Herbert) – 3:01
"Possum Kingdom" (Lewis) – 11:45 Includes hidden track "Cookout", an early instrumental version of "I Burn"

Personnel
Todd Lewis – vocals
Charles Mooney III – guitar
Lisa Umbarger – bass
Mark Reznicek – drums
Darrel Herbert – guitar
Tracey Sauerwein – guitar (on "Possum Kingdom" and "Got a Heart")
Keith Rust – engineer
David Gibson – art

Toadies albums
1993 EPs